Turing tables may refer to:

 Tables of specifications for each instruction in a Turing machine
 A misspelling of the song "Turning Tables", by Adele